In anatomy, temporal branches can refer to any one of several different structures near the temple or temporal bone:

 Nerves
 Temporal branches of the facial nerve - "rami temporales nervi facialis"
 superficial temporal branches of auriculotemporal nerve - "rami temporales superficiales nervi auriculotemporalis"
 Arteries
 Temporal branches of the middle meningeal artery
 Temporal branches of the middle cerebral artery
 posterior temporal branches of lateral occipital artery - "rami temporales posteriores arteriae occipitalis lateralis"
 anterior temporal branches of lateral occipital artery - "rami temporales anteriores arteriae occipitalis lateralis"
 Temporal branches of the superficial temporal artery
 Anterior temporal branch of superficial temporal artery - "ramus frontalis arteriae temporalis superficialis"
 Posterior temporal branch of superficial temporal artery - "ramus parietalis arteriae temporalis superficialis"